Pan or PAN may refer to:

Food and drink 
 Pan, a type of cookware
 Bread pan
 Frying pan
 Sheet pan
 Springform pan
 Harina P.A.N., a pre-cooked corn meal
 Pan or Paan, a North Indian term for betel
 Pan-bagnat
 Pan dulce
 Sliced pan bread, popular in Ireland
 Sugar panning, to add a candy shell to, for example, a nut

Prefix 
 Pan-, a prefix from the Greek πᾶν, pan, meaning "all", "of everything", or "involving all members" of a group
 , most but not all using the prefix

People 
 Pan (surname), Chinese family name (潘 or 盤)
 Pan Ron, Cambodian singer
 Panchan Rina, Japanese kickboxer

Arts, entertainment, and media

Card games 
 Pan (game), a shedding card game of Polish origin
 Panguingue or Pan, a gambling card game

Fictional characters 
 Pan (Dragon Ball), in Dragon Ball media
 Peter Pan, James Barrie's "boy who never grew up"

Films 
 Pan (1922 film), Norwegian film
 Pan (1995 film), 1995 Danish/Norwegian/German film
 Pan (2015 film), a 2015 American film

Literature and publishing 
 Pan (novel), by Knut Hamsun
 Pan (magazine) an arts and literary review
 Pan Books, a publisher

Music

Musical instruments 
 Pan, short for steelpan, an acoustic instrument
 Pan flute or pan pipes, a musical instrument

Groups and labels 
 Pan (band), a Filipino folk/punk rock band
 PAN (record label), a record label and art platform
 Pan, a Turkish band which performed "Bana Bana" at the 1989 Eurovision Song Contest

Titled works 
 Pan (The Blue Hearts), an album by the Japanese band
 Pan, an opera by Carl Venth

Sculpture 
 Pan (Riccio), a 1510s bronze sculpture by Andrea Riccio
 Pan (White), a public artwork by Roger White, in Indianapolis, Indiana, U.S.

Religion and mythology 
 Pan (god), a Greek god
 Night of Pan, a mystical state in the philosophy or religion of Thelema

Science and technology

Astronomy 
 Pan (crater), on Jupiter's moon Amalthea
 Pan (moon), of Saturn
 Pan, a name for Jupiter XI, now Carme (moon), 1955–1975
 4450 Pan, an asteroid

Biology and healthcare 
 Pan (genus), the genus including chimpanzees and bonobos
 Pan, abbreviation for panoramic X-ray
 Pediatric acute-onset neuropsychiatric syndrome (PANS)
 Polyarteritis nodosa, a vasculitic condition
 Positional alcohol nystagmus, eye jerkiness

Chemistry 
 Peroxyacyl nitrates
 Phthalic anhydride
 Polyacrylonitrile, a polymer of acrylonitrile

Computing 
 Pan (newsreader), for Usenet
 Pan (programming language)
 Personal area network
 Bluetooth Personal Area Network (PAN), a Bluetooth profile
 Permanent account number (PAN card), for taxpayers in India and Nepal
 Primary account number, another term for the payment card number of a payment card

Firearms and military 
Flash pan, small receptacle for priming powder, found next to the touch hole on muzzle-loading guns.

Geology 
 Dry lake
 Salt pan (geology), a salt dry lake
 Gold panning, a mining technique

Multimedia technologies 
 Pan and scan, to show wide-screen films on narrow screens
 Panchromatic black-and-white film
 Panning (audio), of a signal into a new sound field
 Panning (camera), swivelling

Languages 
 Proto-Austronesian language
 Punjabi language (ISO 639-3 code "pan")

Organizations

Political parties 
 National Action Party (El Salvador) (Partido Acción Nacional) of El Salvador
 National Action Party (Mexico) (Partido Acción Nacional) of Mexico
 National Action Party (Nicaragua) (Partido Acción Nacional) of Nicaragua
 National Advancement Party (Partido de Avanzada Nacional) of Guatemala
 National Autonomist Party (Partido Autonomista Nacional), former Argentine Political Party
 National Mandate Party (Partai Amanat Nasional) of Indonesia
 Party of the Nation's Retirees (Partido dos Aposentados da Nação) of Brazil
 People-Animals-Nature (Pessoas-Animais-Natureza) of Portugal

Other organizations 
 Nutrition Assistance for Puerto Rico (Programa de Asistencia Nutricional), a United States Federal assistance program
 Pan Club Copenhagen, a gay club
 Pesticide Action Network, an international NGO network
 Polish Academy of Sciences (Polska Akademia Nauk)
 Protect Arizona Now, sponsor of 2004 Arizona Proposition 200

Other uses 
 Pan (horse), an early 19th century British thoroughbred racehorse and sire
 Pan-pan, a radio state of urgency call
 Pan, Slavic honorifics in Poland and Ukraine
 Pansexuality, a sexual orientation (often known as "pan")
 PAN, the ISO 3166-1 alpha-3 code for Panama
 PAN, the National Rail code for Pangbourne railway station in the county of Berkshire, UK
 USA-207, US satellite named "Palladium At Night"
 Bedpan

See also 

 
 
 Pantheism
 Pain (disambiguation)
 Pan Pan (disambiguation)
 Panas (disambiguation)
 Pancake
 Pane (disambiguation)